Rudra Narayan Pany (born 22 April 1959) is an Indian politician of the Bharatiya Janata Party (BJP) and is a Member of the Parliament of India representing Odisha in the Rajya Sabha, the upper house of the Indian Parliament.

References

External links
 Profile on Rajya Sabha website

Living people
1959 births
Bharatiya Janata Party politicians from Odisha
Rajya Sabha members from Odisha
People from Balangir
National Democratic Alliance candidates in the 2014 Indian general election